Gohi Bi Zoro Cyriac Sede (born 15 August 1990), known mononymously as Cyriac, is an Ivorian professional footballer who plays as a forward.

Club career
In March 2004, Cyriac joined ASEC Mimosas. He was a topscorer of Côte d'Ivoire Premier Division in 2008 season. He moved to Charlton Athletic in 2008 as part of a partnership with ASEC, but was unable to obtain a work permit, and on 31 January 2009, he moved to Standard Liège signing a five-year contract with Belgian champions. On 2 July 2012, he signed a four-year contract with RSC Anderlecht.

Having joined Oostende in 2015, Cyriac left for Fulham on 31 January 2017 for the rest of the 2016–17 season. He scored his only goal for Fulham in a 2–2 draw with Blackburn Rovers on 14 March 2017.

In July 2021, Cyriac signed with URSL Visé competing in the third-tier Belgian National Division 1. He left the club in January 2022.

International career
Cyriac made his debut for Ivory Coast in a friendly against Mexico in August 2013. His first goal for his country came in November 2015, in a World Cup qualifying win over Liberia.

Career statistics
Scores and results list Ivory Coast's goal tally first, score column indicates score after each Cyriac goal.

|+ List of international goals scored by Cyriac
|-
| style="text-align:center"|1 || 13 November 2015 || Antoinette Tubman Stadium, Monrovia, Liberia ||  || style="text-align:center"|1–0 || style="text-align:center"|1–0 ||  2018 FIFA World Cup qualification
|-
| style="text-align:center"|2 || 27 March 2017 || Stade Sébastien Charléty, Paris, France ||  || style="text-align:center"|1–1 || style="text-align:center"|1–1 ||  Friendly
|}

Honours
Standard Liège
 Belgian Super Cup: 2009

Anderlecht
 Belgian Pro League: 2012–13, 2013–14
 Belgian Super Cup: 2012, 2013, 2014

Individual
 Côte d'Ivoire Premier Division top scorer: 2008

References

External links
 
 
 
 

1990 births
Living people
People from Daloa
Ivorian footballers
Association football forwards
Ivory Coast international footballers
English Football League players
Süper Lig players
TFF First League players
Belgian Pro League players
Ligue 1 (Ivory Coast) players
ASEC Mimosas players
Charlton Athletic F.C. players
Standard Liège players
R.S.C. Anderlecht players
K.V. Oostende players
Fulham F.C. players
Sivasspor footballers
Giresunspor footballers
URSL Visé players
Ivorian expatriate footballers
Ivorian expatriate sportspeople in England
Expatriate footballers in England
Ivorian expatriate sportspeople in Belgium
Expatriate footballers in Belgium
Ivorian expatriate sportspeople in Turkey
Expatriate footballers in Turkey